SS Kaunas was a Lithuanian Cargo ship that was torpedoed by the German submarine U-57 in the North Sea  west north west of the Noord Hinder Lightship on 17 November 1939 while she was travelling from Ghent, Belgium to Hartlepool, United Kingdom in ballast.

Construction 
Kaunas was launched on 29 January 1931 and completed in July of the same year at the Porsgrund Mekaniske Vaerksted shipyard in Porsgrunn, Norway. The ship could generate 66 n.h.p. with a speed of 10 knots.

Sinking 
She sank stern first in seven minutes with the loss of one crew member. The 15 survivors escaped the ship in two lifeboats and were rescued later that day.

Wreck 

References

1931 ships
Ships built in Norway
World War II shipwrecks in the North Sea
Cargo ships
Ships sunk by German submarines in World War II
Maritime incidents in 1939